CBV MidCap is a stock market index indicating 30 out of 60 stock prices of medium-size companies in Vietnam. The medium-size companies are classified as those having total market capital from VND 150 billion to 500 billion with highest liquidity in these medium-capitalization group.

CBV MidCap, CBV SmallCap, CBV Index form the broader CBV Total.

External links
Overview of CBV MidCap from Bien Viet Securities JSC
List of Companies in CBV MidCap

Vietnamese stock market indices